Hélder Reis (born 1 April 1946) is a Portuguese fencer. He competed in the team épée event at the 1968 Summer Olympics.

References

External links
 

1946 births
Living people
Portuguese male épée fencers
Olympic fencers of Portugal
Fencers at the 1968 Summer Olympics
Sportspeople from Lisbon